Ignacio Sada Madero (born in Mexico) is a Mexican producer.

Filmography

References

External links

Living people
Mexican telenovela producers
Year of birth missing (living people)